Ukmergė (previously Vilkmergė) is a city in Vilnius County, Lithuania, located  northwest of Vilnius, with a population of about 20,000.

Etymology and variant names

The city took its original name Vilkmergė from the Vilkmergėlė River, which was initially called Vilkmergė and assumed a diminutive form after the growth of the settlement. It is commonly thought that the name may be translated as "she-wolf", from the combination of Vilkas (wolf) and Merga (maiden). More likely the second root of the dual-stemmed name is the verb merg-/merk-  meaning "to submerge" or "to dip".  According to local legend, Vilkmergė was a girl raised by wolves, who bridged the divide between animals and humans, in the same way as Rudyard Kipling's Mowgli. The folk etymology of "Ukmergė", by contrast, is "farm girl" (Lith. ūkis = farm). The original name has been adopted by the local soccer team, "Vilkmergė Ukmergė" as well as popular HBH Vilkmergė beer.

Other historic names for the city include Wilkemerge or Wilkamergen in 1225, Vilkenberge (1333), Wilkinberg (1384), (1455), Vilkomir (1455),  Wilkomir (1611),  Wilkomirz (1613),  Wilkomiria (1766), Ukmerge (1900), Aukmergė (1908); Ūkmergė (1911), Wilkomierz (1918), and Vilkmergė (1919).

History

Early history

Ukmergė was first mentioned in 1225, and named as a settlement in 1333. It was essentially a wooden fortress that stood on a hill, near the confluence of the Vilkmergė River and the Šventoji River. Ukmergė was attacked by the Teutonic Knights and the Livonian Order in 1333, 1365, 1378, 1386, and even in 1391, already after the Christianization of Lithuania in 1387. During the last attack, Ukmergė was burned to the ground and had to be completely rebuilt.

The region began to adopt Christianity, along with the rest of Lithuania, in 1386. In the following year, 1387, its first Catholic church, St. Peter and St. Paul, was built. It was one of the first Roman Catholic churches established in Lithuania. The town was granted municipal rights at some time after the Battle of Wiłkomierz in 1435, and written sources dating from 1486 referred to it as a city. King Sigismund the Old confirmed these rights. During the times of the Polish–Lithuanian Commonwealth, the city had been the center of powiat in the Vilnius Voivodeship.

In 1655, the Swedish and Russian armies plundered the city. Because of these incessant wars, the growth of Ukmergė suffered many setbacks. Jews began to settle in the city in the late 17th century, and built a synagogue and a cemetery. In the years 1711–1712, the bubonic plague swept through the town and wreaked havoc upon its population. In 1792, by the initiative of the city's representative in the Great Sejm, Józef Dominik Kossakowski, King Stanisław August Poniatowski renewed the town's municipal rights and gave it its current coat of arms.

18th and 19th centuries
In 1795, the town, along with most of Lithuania, was annexed by Russia, becoming a part of the Vilna Governorate. In 1812 the Battle of Deltuva, between the Russian and French armies, occurred not far from Ukmergė; Napoleon's army raided the town during the French invasion of Russia. During the November Uprising in 1831, the city remained in the hands of rebel elements for several months. In 1843, the town became a part of the newly established Kovno Governorate. In 1863, the city  participated in the January Uprising against Russia. In 1876 a match factory was established in Ukmergė. In 1877 a fire again ravaged the town. The future president of Lithuania, Antanas Smetona, was born in Užulėnis near Ukmergė, and was educated in the local school. In 1882 a printing-house was opened. In 1899 thirteen people were punished for distributing books written in the Lithuanian language, which was prohibited at that time.

20th century
In 1918, after Lithuania declared its independence, the city's name was changed from Vilkmergė to Ukmergė. In 1919 Bolshevik forces occupied the city during the Lithuanian–Soviet War, but it was soon liberated by the Lithuanian army led by Jonas Variakojis. Over five hundred Bolshevik prisoners were taken during the Battle of Ukmergė. An iron foundry was established in the same year. In 1920, the Lithuanian army stopped Polish incursions into the rest of the country, after a series of battles that were waged to establish borders between the two newly re-established countries. An electric plant, a printing house and 120 other small businesses were opened. The city had five newspapers until 1939. In 1930, a monument named Lituania Restituta was erected to commemorate the first decade of restored Lithuanian independence. A Polish high school also operated in Ukmergė during the interbellum.

In 1940, after the Soviet occupation of Lithuania, deportations of people from the town began. When the Germans attacked the Soviet Union and its occupied territories, on June 22, 1941, the retreating Soviets gave instructions to their operatives to kill some 120 prisoners; however, most of them escaped; only eight of them were tortured to death. After the German invasion, the Nazis rounded up and killed about 10,000 members of the town's Jewish population with the help of Lithuanian collaborators. During World War II, the city center suffered from extensive bomb damage.

For years after the return of the Soviets, the city's people organized and participated in resistance movements. The deportation of the city's population to Siberia continued. In 1950 the monument to Lithuania's Independence was destroyed. The city reconstructed it in 1990, even before the restoration of Lithuania's independence was declared. Around 1964, two coupled Soviet R-12 Dvina (SS-4) nuclear missile bases were built in the woods near Ukmergė under Nikita Khrushchev. Each had four surface launch pads, semi-underground hangars to store the missiles and several accessory buildings. The bases were mentioned in the 1987 Intermediate-Range Nuclear Forces Treaty between the United States and the Soviet Union. They both are in a ruined state at present, and freely accessible to the public.

Notable people
 Bruno Abakanowicz, Polish mathematician, born in 1852, Vilkomir (Ukmergė)
 Alexander Braudo, author and publisher, born in 1864, Vilkomir (Ukmergė)
 Chaim Freinkel, philanthropist, lived, worked, and established schools in Ukmergė
 Antanas Smetona, president of Lithuania from 1919–1920 and from 1926–1940, was born nearby and educated in the local school system
 Leib Gurwicz, Rabbi and Talmudic scholar, studied at the yeshivah school here
 Yosef Shlomo Kahaneman, Rabbi and Lithuanian parliamentarian, built yeshivas, a school and an orphanage in Ukmergė
 Moshe Leib Lilienblum, scholar and author
 Ben Shahn, American artist, muralist, social activist, photographer and teacher, lived in Ukmerge in the early 1900s
 Bob Sredersas, Lithuanian-Australian art collector went to school here
 Zigmas Zinkevičius, Lithuanian linguist, acquired his early schooling in Ukmergė.
 Vida Vencienė, Olympic cross country skiing gold medalist.
 Woolf Wess, also known as William Wess or William West, a Jewish anarchist, trade union organizer, and editor of the London-based Yiddish-language anarchist newspaper, Arbeyter Fraynd (Worker's Friend), born in Ukmergė in 1861 and emigrated to London, England, dying there in 1946
 Stanisław Lech Woronowicz, Polish mathematician, born in 1941, Ukmergė

Twin towns — sister cities

Ukmergė is twinned with:

 Bad Langensalza, Germany
 Cologno al Serio, Italy
 Kamianets-Podilskyi, Ukraine
 Kiskunmajsa, Hungary
 Herrljunga, Sweden
 Līvāni, Latvia
 Mariestad, Sweden
 Põlva, Estonia
 Tarnowo Podgórne, Poland
 Tsalenjikha, Georgia
 Unstrut-Hainich-Kreis, Germany
 Västra Götaland County, Sweden
 Wetteraukreis, Germany
 Worcester, England, United Kingdom
  Esztergom, Hungary
  Kiskunlacháza, Hungary

References

External links

 The official page of the Municipality of the Ukmerge Region in Lithuanian language
 The original coat of arms from 1792 in Lithuanian language
 History of Ukmergė
 Nuclear missile sites near Ukmergė
 The Jewish Community of Vilkomir/Ukmerge, The Museum of the Jewish People at Beit Hatfutsot

 
Cities in Vilnius County
Cities in Lithuania
Municipalities administrative centres of Lithuania
Hill forts in Lithuania
Vilnius Voivodeship
Vilkomirsky Uyezd
Shtetls
Holocaust locations in Lithuania
Ukmergė District Municipality